Google Insights for Search was a service by Google similar to Google Trends, providing insights into the search terms people use in the Google search engine. Unlike Google Trends, Google Insights for Search provides a visual representation of regional interest on a country's map. It displays top searches and rising searches that may help with keyword research. Results can be narrowed down with categories that are displayed for each search terms.

Term order is important in searches, and that different results will be found if keywords are placed in a different order.

On September 27, 2012, Google Insights for Search was closed and merged into Google Trends again.

See also
 Google Search Console
 Google Trends

References

External links 
 Insights for Search Home
 Google's Realtime Penguin Updated affected Search Insights
 Short Tail vs Long Tail Keywords - Which Should I use?

Insights
Beta software
Insights